Watson & Huckel was an architectural firm from Philadelphia that existed as a partnership between Frank Rushmore Watson and Samuel Huckel between 1902 and 1917.  The firm was known as a prolific office that had many church commissions—Watson specialized in church architecture and Huckel worked with him until 1917, the year of his (Huckel's) death; the pair worked on many projects from Worcester Union Station to the Cumberland County Courthouse and a great deal of churches.  During the early years of their partnership, Watson and Huckel maintained a New York office, however few projects were listed out of that office and they did eventually close it.

See also
 Frank Rushmore Watson
 Samuel Huckel

References

Defunct architecture firms based in Pennsylvania
20th-century American architects
Architects from Philadelphia